Ali Eren İyican (born 26 June 1999) is a Turkish professional footballer who plays as a defender for 1461 Trabzon on loan from Bodrumspor.

Career
A youth product of Osmanlıspor, İyican made his professional debut in a 3-1 Turkish Cup win over Yeni Malatyaspor on 28 November 2017. He made his league debut in a 2-1 Süper Lig loss to Akhisarspor on 18 May 2018.

International career
İyican represented the Turkey U23s in their winning campaign at the 2021 Islamic Solidarity Games.

Honours
Turkey U23
Islamic Solidarity Games: 2021

References

External links
 
 
 

1999 births
Living people
Sportspeople from Mersin
Turkish footballers
Turkey youth international footballers
Association football defenders
Ankaraspor footballers
Antalyaspor footballers
1461 Trabzon footballers
Süper Lig players
TFF First League players
TFF Second League players